The Pearl Report is a public affairs programme aired on TVB Pearl from 1 April 1988 to 25 June 2018.

The show mainly deals with current affairs in Hong Kong, although there are also stories concerning wider regional and international issues, often produced abroad. Locations covered include the United Kingdom, the United States, Australia, Germany, Russia, Malaysia, Canada, Oman, Vietnam, Thailand, Japan, the Philippines, the United Arab Emirates and all different parts of China.

A broad spectrum of topic areas is covered on the Pearl Report, including political, social, health, education, human rights, economic and sport-related issues.

Pearl Magazine, the successor to The Pearl Report, debuted on 2 July 2018 at the same airtime.

History
The programme first broadcast in 1988. It was cancelled by TVB in 2018 with the last original programme was aired on 21 May 2018. After that episode, the same time slot re-run 5 more previously award-winning episodes, making 25 June as the final air date.

Format
The show is divided into two segments to make up a half-hour show. In-depth documentaries normally last the entire duration of the programme but some stories take up just a single segment.

Each segment begins with an introduction from the show's host and Senior Executive Producer Diana Lin.  The stories often start with a teaser to set the tone. Part One usually ends with a hook, giving viewers a taste of what is to follow in Part Two. After a commercial break Diana Lin reappears to introduce the next part, which tends to contain greater focus than the first segment. The host returns at the end of the programme to sign off.

Producers/reporters
The Pearl Report team is made up of its Senior Executive Producer, Diana Lin, six full-time producers and a part-time reporter. They were:

  Diana Lin (Host, 1988-2018)
  Chris Lincoln (Host, 2018)
  Maria Cristhin Kuiper
  Victor Ting
  Keina Chiu
  Ambrose Li

Previous producers include: 
  Renato Reyes
  Aleks Solum
  Billy Wong
  Yan Zhao
  Christy Leung 
  Annie Lau
  Phillippa Stewart 
  Chan Siu Sin 
  Vince Lung 
  Naomi Kwok
  Douglas George 
  Rainbow Ngai 
  Erica Poon 
  Sebastian Chau
  Douglas Lam 
  Diane To
  Gus Chan
  Joyce Liu
  Peter Maize (Host until 1990s)
  Emily Maitlis

Interviewees
A number of notable figures have been interviewed on The Pearl Report.

Interviewees include:

Margaret Thatcher
Vidal Ramos
Lu Ping
Gloria Macapagal Arroyo
Lee Kwan Yew
David Akers-Jones
Timothy Fok
Matthew Hoggard
Lim Guan Eng
Chris Patten
Stephen Chan Chi-wan
Donald Tsang
Anson Chan

Awards
Pearl Report shows have won numerous awards including:

The New York TV and Film Festival Award
RTNA Edward Murrow: Asia Television Award

References

External links
MyTV.com
Storm Riders
The Facilities Farce

TVB original programming
English-language television shows
1988 Hong Kong television series debuts